First-seeded Helen Wills defeated Eileen Bennett 6–1, 6–2 in the final to win the women's singles tennis title at the 1928 French Championships. The draw consisted of 37 players of which 8 were seeded.

Seeds
The seeded players are listed below. Helen Wills is the champion; others show the round in which they were eliminated.

 Helen Wills (champion)
 Suzanne Devé (second round)
 Kea Bouman (semifinals)
 Daphne Akhurst (quarterfinals)
 Elisabeth Macready (second round)
 Lilly De Alvarez (first round)
 Marguerite Bordes (third round)
 Eileen Bennett (finalist)

Draw

Key
 Q = Qualifier
 WC = Wild card
 LL = Lucky loser
 r = Retired

Finals

Earlier rounds

Section 1

Section 2

Section 3

Section 4

References

External links
 

1928 in women's tennis
1928
1928 in French women's sport
1928 in French tennis